Sung Nien-yu (born 22 November 1983), better known by his stage name Xiao Yu, is a Taiwanese singer, songwriter, and record producer.

Career
Most of Xiao Yu's early career was spent behind the scenes, writing and producing music for numerous Mandarin singers. He released his debut album Classmate Xiao Yu That's Me in 2008 which garnered widespread acclaim. This was followed up with the 2009 release of the album Standing Here where the album spent twenty-one consecutive weeks in the G-Music top twenty album sales chart. In 2013, he received a nomination for Best Mandarin Male Singer at the 24th Golden Melody Awards for One More Time. After a 5-year break from music, to complete his military service and going through restructure of his previous record company, Xiao Yu returned with his fourth studio album in 2017, With You,  his first release under Warner Music Taiwan.

Discography

Studio albums

Singles

Soundtrack album

Awards and nominations

References

External links 

 
Xiao Yu on Sina Weibo  
  

1983 births
Living people
21st-century Taiwanese male singers
Taiwanese Mandopop singer-songwriters
Musicians from Taoyuan City